Salagena mirabilis is a moth in the family Cossidae. It is found in Angola.

References

Natural History Museum Lepidoptera generic names catalog

Metarbelinae
Endemic fauna of Angola
Moths described in 1919